The LNWR George the Fifth class 2013 Prince George is a full size LNWR George the Fifth Class steam locomotive under construction by the LNWR George the Fifth Steam Locomotive Trust, a Registered Charity. The 'George' is a classic example of an LNWR express engine of which no example survived into preservation. Therefore, the Trust is progressing towards 'making good this gap', and the new George is currently being constructed at Heckmondwicke and at Keyte Smith Ltd of Nether Broughton.

The Trust relies upon donations and regular contributions in order to fund the project. The Trust's short-term aims are currently focused on funding on the lower end (frame erection) and increasing the number of subscribers and active donors.

In July 2013 the Trust approached the Duke of Cambridge and Duchess of Cambridge to name their locomotive after their newborn son Prince George. The Duke and Duchess accepted, and the locomotive was given the number '2013', the year of his birth, and named 'Prince George' on 22 July 2014, in honour of his first birthday.

About the Class
They were essentially superheated versions of the LNWR Whale Precursor Class. At the same time, similar non-superheated Queen Mary Class engines were also built, but all of these acquired superheaters as the advantages of superheating became clear and were absorbed into the George the Fifth Class. The Precursors were then converted at overhauls to conform with the successful George specification; they were more than 25% more powerful, the only visual difference being the Splashers over the driving wheel.

Project launch
The Trust has been going since 2012 undertaking detailed evaluations and planning, whilst building up valuable information and drawings, this culminated in the fabrication of the smokebox door. The project was officially launched on 22 July 2014 with the unveiling of name, cabside and splasher assembly; this took place at Quorn on the Great Central Railway Loughborough.

Construction
Only one 20th century LNWR locomotive exists, meaning there are virtually no spare parts in existence. Thus the whole build will have to be from scratch. The Trust has acquired genuine auxiliary fittings including an LNWR whistle which came off a 0-6-2 tank. A presentation of the whistle took place on the footplate of Hardwicke at the 2012 Railfest at York. The front frames are being cut at Corus Steel, Cradley Heath in the West Midlands. Whilst detailed calculations are made to allow the rear portion to be cut, work is continuing on the smokebox with the frames expected to be erected during 2015.

Project future
The Trust has stated it will cost between £1.5 and £2 million to complete Prince George. Funds are being raised through private donation and sponsorship of parts. Raising the necessary capital is done through having a presence at events, giving talks and generating publicity through the media. The Prince is Born is a Trust noted strapline.

References

London and North Western Railway locomotives
4-4-0 locomotives
Standard gauge steam locomotives of Great Britain
Railway locomotives introduced in 1910
Steam locomotives of the 21st century